William Anthony McGuire (July 9, 1881 – September 16, 1940) was an American playwright, theatre director, and producer and  screenwriter, including The Kid From Spain (1932) starring Eddie Cantor. McGuire earned an Oscar nomination for the 1936 film The Great Ziegfeld, the Best Picture Oscar winner of 1936.

Born in Chicago, Illinois, McGuire made his Broadway debut in 1910 as author of the play The Heights. He went on to write, direct, and produce Twelve Miles Out (1925) and If I Was Rich (1926) and write and direct Rosalie (1928), Whoopee! (1928), The Three Musketeers (1928), and Show Girl (1929).

McGuire is quoted by the gossip columnist Sidney Skolsky as saying of his profession and milieu, "Broadway's a great street when you're going up.  When you're going down -- take Sixth Avenue."

McGuire died of uremia in Beverly Hills, California.

References

External links

1881 births
1940 deaths
American theatre directors
American male screenwriters
Writers from Chicago
American male dramatists and playwrights
20th-century American dramatists and playwrights
20th-century American male writers
Screenwriters from Illinois
20th-century American screenwriters